Cuatrillo (capital: Ꜭ, small: ꜭ) (Spanish for "little four") is a letter of several colonial Mayan alphabets in the Latin script that is based on the digit 4. It was invented by a Franciscan friar, Alonso de la Parra, in the 16th century to represent the velar ejective consonant  found in Mayan languages, and is known as one of the Parra letters. 

A derivative of the cuatrillo by adding a diacritic, was used for the alveolar ejective affricate  found in the same languages. 

As an example of use, the letter appears when spelling the name of the Kʼicheʼ language in the Parra orthography: .

See also
Tresillo

References

External links
Cuatrillo and Tresillo in Recent Linguistic Publications
N3028: Proposal to add Mayanist Latin letters to the UCS

4 Cuatrillo
Mayan languages